

65001–65100 

|-
| 65001 Teodorescu ||  || Ana Maria Teodorescu, Romanian astronomer and wife of co-discoverer Fabrizio Bernardi. Her research includes modeling the evolution of X-ray binaries and the discovery of planetary nebulae in elliptical galaxies. || 
|-id=091
| 65091 Saramagrin || 2002 CF || Sara Magrin (born 1976), Italian astronomer, active member of the Asiago-DLR Asteroid Survey || 
|-id=100
| 65100 Birtwhistle ||  || Peter Birtwhistle (born 1958), British amateur astronomer and discoverer of minor planets || 
|}

65101–65200 

|-id=159
| 65159 Sprowls ||  || Marlene Sprowls Durig, mother of the discoverer Douglas Tybor Durig || 
|}

65201–65300 

|-id=210
| 65210 Stichius || 2002 EG || Stichius, a Greek warrior at Troy, who together with Menestheus, carried the body of Amphimachus back to the Archaen troops. This prevented Hektor from stealing Amphimachus's helm || 
|-id=213
| 65213 Peterhobbs ||  || Englishman Peter Hobbs (born 1925), a master draughtsman for the British National Coal Board, a lifelong member of Mensa and a perfect-pitch pianist who teaches many students. || 
|-id=241
| 65241 Seeley ||  || Bob Seeley (born 1928), an accomplished Detroit pianist, playing music from Gershwin and Debussy to Scott Joplin. || 
|-id=244
| 65244 Ianwong ||  || Ian Wong (born 1990) is a postdoctoral fellow at the Massachusetts Institute of Technology (Cambridge, MA). His studies include photometric colors and spectroscopic measurements of Hilda asteroids, Jupiter Trojans, centaurs and Kuiper Belt Objects. || 
|}

65301–65400 

|-id=357
| 65357 Antoniucci ||  || Simone Antoniucci (born 1977), an Italian astronomer who obtained his degree in physics at "La Sapienza" University of Rome in 2003, with a thesis on infrared spectroscopy of protostars. He is currently a Ph.D. student in Astronomy at Tor Vergata University, Rome, studying Young Stellar Objects using infrared high resolution spectroscopy and interferometry. || 
|-id=363
| 65363 Ruthanna ||  || Ruthanna Dellinger Powell (1933–2003), aunt of American amateur astronomer Joseph A. Dellinger who discovered this minor planet. She was the youngest child of a large Indiana farm family. The devoted lifelong wife of Tommy Powell and mother of three, she brought peace, love and joy to all around her and faced life with quiet courage through tragedy and illness (Img). || 
|}

65401–65500 

|-id=487
| 65487 Divinacommedia ||  || The Divine Comedy ("Divina Commedia") is the most important poem by Dante Alighieri (1265–1321). It is considered one of the greatest works in world literature and includes many astronomical concepts of the time. This naming occurs on the 700th anniversary of Dante's death. || 
|-id=489
| 65489 Ceto ||  || Ceto, mythological monstrous sea creature, child of Gaia and Pontus; together with its sibling Phorcys (65489 Ceto I Phorcys), it produced numerous offspring, the Phorcydides || 
|}

65501–65600 

|-id=541
| 65541 Kasbek || 9593 P-L || Kasbek, high inactive volcano in the Georgian Caucasus, near the Russian border || 
|-id=583
| 65583 Theoklymenos || 4646 T-2 || Theoklymenos, son of Mantios and grandson of Melampus, Greek seer who, in the Odyssey, prophesies Odysseus' return to Ithaca and the death of Penelope's suitors || 
|-id=590
| 65590 Archeptolemos || 1305 T-3 || Archeptolemos, Trojan charioteer of Hector, killed by Teucer with the help of Apollo || 
|}

65601–65700 

|-id=637
| 65637 Tsniimash ||  || TsNIIMash is an acronym for the Central Research Institute of Mechanical Engineering, which is an institute of the Russian Federal Space Agency. || 
|-id=657
| 65657 Hube ||  || Douglas P. Hube (born 1941), Canadian astronomer and president of the Royal Astronomical Society of Canada from 1994 to 1996 || 
|-id=658
| 65658 Gurnikovskaya ||  || Renata Yur'evna Gurnikovskaya (born 1974) is the older daughter of the discoverer || 
|-id=672
| 65672 Merrick || 1988 QD || In spite of facing the challenge of a rare form of leukemia, Dawson Tate Merrick (1999–2009) excelled at all he attempted, from his academic studies to sports || 
|-id=675
| 65675 Mohr-Gruber ||  || Curate Josef Mohr (1792–1848) and his organist Franz Xaver Gruber (1787–1863), Austrian musicians, composers of the Christmas carol "Silent Night! Holy Night!" (Stille Nacht, heilige Nacht) || 
|-id=685
| 65685 Behring ||  || Emil von Behring (1854–1917), German medical doctor and Nobelist, founder of the science of immunology || 
|-id=692
| 65692 Trifu ||  || Romanian-born Cezar I. Trifu (born 1954) studies the physics of seismic sources and induced seismicity as senior scientist and adjunct professor at Queen's University, Canada. He is the author of many papers and books. Trifu is also a world-famous short-wave radio operator. Name proposed by the first discoverer. || 
|-id=694
| 65694 Franzrosenzweig ||  || Franz Rosenzweig (1886–1929), modern Jewish religious thinker || 
|-id=696
| 65696 Pierrehenry ||  || Pierre Henry Senegas-Lowe (born 1989), son of the discoverer Andrew Lowe || 
|-id=697
| 65697 Paulandrew ||  || Paul Andrew Senegas-Lowe (born 1992), son of the discoverer Andrew Lowe || 
|-id=698
| 65698 Emmarochelle ||  || Emma Rochelle Slater (born 1989), stepdaughter of the discoverer Andrew Lowe || 
|}

65701–65800 

|-id=708
| 65708 Ehrlich ||  || Paul Ehrlich (1854–1915), German Nobelist, pioneer of hematology, immunology and chemotherapy || 
|-id=712
| 65712 Schneidmüller ||  || Bernd Schneidmüller (born 1954), a German historian || 
|-id=716
| 65716 Ohkinohama ||  || Ohkinohama is a 1.5-kilometer-long beach adjacent to the eastern part of Ashizurimisaki promontory at the southern end of Shikoku Island || 
|-id=769
| 65769 Mahalia ||  || Mahalia Jackson (1911–1972), American "Queen of Gospel Song" || 
|-id=770
| 65770 Leonardotestoni ||  || Leonardo Testoni (born 2017) is the first nephew of one of the co-discoverers of this minor planet. || 
|-id=775
| 65775 Reikotosa ||  || Reiko Tosa (born 1976), Japanese long-distance runner || 
|-id=784
| 65784 Naderayama ||  || Naderayama mountain (height 660 meters), located in the west of Yonezawa city, Yamagata prefecture || 
|-id=785
| 65785 Carlafracci ||  || Carla Fracci (1936–2021) was an Italian ballet dancer and actress, recognized for her interpretations of romantic and dramatic roles || 
|}

65801–65900 

|-id=803
| 65803 Didymos || 1996 GT || Greek for "twin" as the object was named after its binarity was confirmed in 2003 || 
|-id=821
| 65821 De Curtis ||  || Antonio De Curtis (1898–1967), nicknamed "Tot", was an Italian artist, comedian, film and theatre actor, writer, singer and songwriter. || 
|-id=848
| 65848 Enricomari ||  || Enrico Mari (1978–2007), a cousin of the discoverer and a member of the Montelupo Astronomical Group || 
|-id=852
| 65852 Alle ||  || Alessandro Colombini (born 2018), son of Alberto and Elena, and nephew of Italian amateur astronomer Ermes Colombini, who observes at the San Vittore Observatory where this minor planet was discovered. || 
|-id=859
| 65859 Mädler ||  || Johann Heinrich von Mädler (1794–1874) German astronomer and selenographer || 
|-id=885
| 65885 Lubenow ||  || Alexander Lubenow (1956–2005), American program coordinator at the Space Telescope Science Institute (Src) || 
|-id=894
| 65894 Echizenmisaki ||  || Echizenmisaki is a promontory in Fukui prefecture that projects into the Sea of Japan. It is a famous tourist attraction. || 
|}

65901–66000 

|-bgcolor=#f2f2f2
| colspan=4 align=center | 
|}

References 

065001-066000